Fort Prince George was an uncompleted fort on what is now the site of Pittsburgh, at the confluence of the Allegheny and Monongahela Rivers in Allegheny County, Pennsylvania. The site was originally a trading post established by Ohio Company trader William Trent in the 1740s. Construction of Fort Prince George, named for the crown prince and later King George III), was begun in January 1754 by 41 Virginians.  The plan to occupy the strategic forks was formed by Virginia Lieutenant Governor Robert Dinwiddie, on the advice of Lieutenant Colonel George Washington, whom Dinwiddie had sent on a mission to warn French commanders they were on English territory in late 1753, and had made a military assessment of the site. Captain Trent commanded the force constructing the fort, but his men were captured by 1,000 French soldiers and Indians led by Claude-Pierre Pécaudy de Contrecœur. At the time of the French arrival, Trent was at Wills Creek for a conference, while his second-in-command, Lieutenant John Fraser, was at his own plantation at Turtle Creek on the Mononghela River. Ensign Edward Ward was left to surrender the fort on April 18, 1754. The French attack was the hostile act of the war, and it led to George Washington's own surprise attack at the Battle of Jumonville Glen.

Lieutenant Fraser was court-martialled for desertion at Williamsburg, but he was acquitted and later served as Chief of Scouts to General Edward Braddock's army.

This was the first of five forts that would be built to control the strategic "Forks of the Ohio". The French erected Fort Duquesne after seizing Fort Prince George. Then the British built Fort Pitt after they captured the French post in the 1758 Forbes Expedition. Mercer's Fort was a temporary British fort built to defend against a French counterattack while Fort Pitt was being constructed. The final fort in what is now downtown Pittsburgh was an American post called Fort Lafayette and was located farther up the Allegheny River.

References
 

French and Indian War forts
Forts in Pennsylvania
Colonial forts in Pennsylvania
British forts in the United States
History of Pittsburgh